Mugen is the ninth single by the Japanese pop-rock band Porno Graffitti. It was released on May 15, 2002. The title has two different meanings: "infinity" (無限 mugen) and "fantasy" (夢幻 mugen). These two words are homonyms. 2002 FIFA World Cup NHK theme song and image song.

Track listing

References

2002 singles
Porno Graffitti songs
FIFA World Cup songs